Cangetta aurantiaca is a moth in the family Crambidae. It was described by George Hampson in 1906. It is found in New Guinea and Australia, where it has been recorded from Queensland.

There are three broad bands of yellow shades on each wing.

References

Moths described in 1906
Spilomelinae